Čalgija or Chalgiya (Macedonian language: Чалгија; Bulgarian language: Чалгия) is a Macedonian and Bulgarian music genre, which also is a subgenre of the old urban traditional folk music (starogradska muzika) of Macedonia and Bulgaria.

Čalgija is performed by ensembles called Čalgii (Чалгии) with instruments such as a dajre (tambourine) and tarabuka (hourglass drum) providing percussion for ut (lute), kanun (zither), clarinet and violin.

Čalgija or is an old part of the whole Macedonian and Bulgarian folklore art (this includes the rural folklore as well) and it should not be confused with Chalga (a contemporary Turbofolk music style in Bulgaria).

See also
Starogradska muzika
Music of North Macedonia
Music of Bulgaria
Turbo-folk
Chalga
Skiladiko
Arabesque (Turkish music)
Music of Lebanon
Arabic pop music
Tallava

References

External links
Kaldrma: Macedonian Chalgia Music (Keepers Of Tradition) CD review at Allaboutjazz.com

Macedonian music
Pop music genres
Balkan music
Turkish words and phrases
Folk music genres